Nobody's Child may refer to:

Film and television
Nobody's Child (1919 film), a British silent film directed by George Edwardes Hall
Nobody's Child (1970 film), a Philippine film featuring Vilma Santos
Nobody's Child (1986 film), an American television film directed by Lee Grant
Nobody's Child (2004 film), a Singaporean film directed by Lin Wenhui

Literature
 Nobody's Child, a 1996 romantic novel by Pat Warren
 Nobody's Child, a 1997 romantic novel by Ann Major
 Nobody's Child, a 2003 children's novel by Marsha Skrypuch
 Nobody's Child, a 2007 autobiography by Michael Seed
 Nobody's Child, a 2014 crime novel by Libby Fischer Hellmann

Music
Nobody's Child: Romanian Angel Appeal, a 1990 charity album
"Nobody's Child" (Hank Snow song), 1949; covered by Tony Sheridan and the Beatles (1964), the Traveling Wilburys (1990), and others
"Nobody's Child" (Penny McLean song), 1976
"Nobody's Child", a song  by Electric Light Orchestra from Eldorado, 1974
"Nobody's Child", a song by Mark Knopfler from Down the Road Wherever, 2018

See also
No One's Child, a 2014 Serbian film
Nobody's Children (disambiguation)